Jack Twyford (12 October 1908 – 15 August 1991) was an Australian rules footballer who played in the VFL in 1929 for the South Melbourne Football Club, between 1930 and 1933 for the Richmond Football Club and in 1934 for the Collingwood Football Club.

References

 Hogan P: The Tigers Of Old, Richmond FC, Melbourne 1996

External links

 
 

Sydney Swans players
Richmond Football Club players
Richmond Football Club Premiership players
Collingwood Football Club players
Eltham Football Club players
Australian rules footballers from Victoria (Australia)
1908 births
1991 deaths
One-time VFL/AFL Premiership players